Alyssa Kleiner (born April 1, 1993) is an American soccer player who played as a defender for Seattle Reign FC in the NWSL.

Career
Kleiner played for Portland Thorns FC in 2015. In February 2016, she was traded to Washington Spirit in exchange for Katherine Reynolds. In 2016, Kleiner played 17 regular season matches, 12 starts, totaling 1115 minutes She also subbed into the NWSL Championship for an injured Caprice Dydasco. Kleiner scored her first professional goal against Sky Blue FC on July 31. She also had one assist to her name on the season.

References

External links
Santa Clara bio

1993 births
Living people
American women's soccer players
Santa Clara Broncos women's soccer players
Portland Thorns FC players
Washington Spirit players
National Women's Soccer League players
Sportspeople from Las Vegas
Soccer players from Las Vegas
Women's association football defenders
OL Reign players